Tania Gener (born ) is a Spanish artistic gymnast, representing her nation at international competitions.  

She participated at the 2004 Summer Olympics. 
She also competed at world championships, including the 2006 World Artistic Gymnastics Championships in  Aarhus, Denmark.

References

External links
Sports Reference
www.gymmedia.com
Getty Images
YouTube

1988 births
Living people
Spanish female artistic gymnasts
Place of birth missing (living people)
Gymnasts at the 2004 Summer Olympics
Olympic gymnasts of Spain
Spanish cheerleaders
21st-century Spanish dancers
Mediterranean Games gold medalists for Spain
Mediterranean Games silver medalists for Spain
Mediterranean Games bronze medalists for Spain
Mediterranean Games medalists in gymnastics
Competitors at the 2005 Mediterranean Games